Salvador Artigas Sahún (23 February 1913, Barcelona, Spain – 6 September 1997, Benidorm, Spain) was a Spanish footballer and manager.

He was also manager for FC Barcelona, Athletic Bilbao and FC Sevilla.
During the Spanish civil war, was a pilot for the republican side.

External links

 Profile
 La Liga profile

Footballers from Barcelona
Spanish footballers
Association football defenders
FC Girondins de Bordeaux players
Ligue 1 players
Le Mans FC players
Stade Rennais F.C. players
Expatriate footballers in France
Real Sociedad footballers
FC Barcelona players
La Liga players
Spanish football managers
Real Sociedad managers
FC Barcelona managers
Spain national football team managers
Elche CF managers
Athletic Bilbao managers
Sevilla FC managers
FC Girondins de Bordeaux managers
1913 births
1997 deaths